The Peja Hamam or Old Bath is an Ottoman-Turkish bath in Peja, Kosovo, built in the second half of the 15th century. The building consists of an asymmetric "double" bath. According to some sources the bath was reconstructed in 1861  for unknown reasons. The bath was damaged during war and was reconstructed after. Today, the hammam serves as an exhibition hall for different art shows and more.

References

External links

Buildings and structures in Peja
Ottoman baths in Kosovo
Rebuilt buildings and structures
15th-century establishments in the Ottoman Empire
Cultural heritage monuments in Peja District